Cytherissa is a genus of crustaceans belonging to the family Cytherideidae.

The species of this genus are found in Europe, Russia and Northern America.

Species:
 Cytherissa lacustris (Sars, 1863) 
 Cytherissa simplissima Swain

References

Podocopida
Podocopida genera